The Montefiore Synagogue  is the former private synagogue of Sir Moses Montefiore. It is an 1833, Grade II* listed building in Ramsgate, Kent, England. The synagogue and mausoleum are cared for and maintained by the Montefiore Endowment.  The endowment also maintains the nearby Ramsgate Jewish Cemetery.

History
Sir Moses Montefiore first came to Ramsgate in 1812 on his honeymoon with his wife Judith Cohen, sister-in-law to Nathan Rothschild.  Ramsgate had had a small Jewish Community since 1786.  The synagogue was in the European tradition of great men having private chapels on their estates.  Sir Moses Montefiore had the synagogue built immediately upon purchasing East Cliff Lodge in 1831. On the day the building was dedicated, Montefiore fulfilled the Jewish custom of marking such an occasion by giving charity to the poor by giving money to be distributed  by the priests of the two neighbouring Church of England parishes.  David Mocatta, a cousin, was hired to design the Synagogue.  Mocatta estimated the cost at between £1,500 and £1,600 exclusive of the interior which was to cost from £300 to £400.  The foundation stone was laid on the New Moon of Tammuz 5691 or 9 August 1831.

In 1869, Sir Moses founded the Lady Judith Montefiore Theological College, a yeshivah.  This was located to the rear of the synagogue; it was demolished in 1965.  The work of the college is continued today in London and is run by the Montefiore Endowment.  The site of the college is now owned by Ramsgate Town Council and maintained by volunteers as a dedicated woodland.

East Cliff Lodge was demolished in 1954.  The grounds are now the King George VI Memorial Park.  The entrance gates, gate-house and Italianate Greenhouse still stand.

In 2007 a general medical practice opened on the grounds of the former estate. The developer contributed funds to preserve the woodlands next to the historic synagogue.

The rite of the synagogue is that of Bevis Marks in the City of London.  Regular services are no longer held due to a lack of a local Sephardi congregation.

Architecture
The building is set on a knoll that, in Sir Moses' day, overlooked extensive gardens.

The synagogue is a noted example of ecclesiastical Regency architecture. The architect was Montefiore's cousin, David Mocatta. It was the first purpose-built synagogue in Britain designed by a Jewish architect. It is a masonry building covered with stucco.  The building is a rectangular with canted corners and a semicircular apse to accommodate the Torah Ark. The small vestibule contains the stairway of the women's gallery.  The facade features a clock, which is the only example in an English Synagogue. The clock bears the motto, Time flies, virtue alone remains.  The Montefiore coat of arms was a later addition to the facade.

The typically Regency interior features an octagonal dome with a lantern to admit daylight, and a window over the Torah Ark. The interior was originally of whitewashed plaster. The pink, grey and cream marble and granite walls and much of the furniture were added by Montefiore's heirs in 1912. Oak furniture and iron gallery supports were added in 1933. Windows on the northeast and southeast walls with stained glass were also added in 1933.

The synagogue is illuminated by candles in the original chandeliers. The gallery is curtained by an old-fashioned, tall latticework. It retains Lady Montefiore's original seat, no. 3. Sir Moses' seat is on the ground floor.  In 1933, the original wooden board with the prayer for the Royal Family was moved to the Bristol Synagogue.

In the lobby there is a memorial to a member of the family, Captain Robert Sebag-Montefiore who was killed in Gallipoli during World War 1.

Mausoleum

Next to the synagogue is the tomb which is the final resting place of Sir Moses and Judith, Lady Montefiore. It is a replica of Rachel's Tomb on the road from Jerusalem to Bethlehem. During an 1841 visit to the Levant, Montefiore got permission from the Ottoman Empire to restore the tomb.

Like Rachel's tomb, the Montefiore mausoleum is cube surmounted by a dome. It has an open, arched porch. The interior has a stained glass skylight but no other decoration. The two graves are marked by identical chest tombs of Aberdeen marble. The graves face east, towards Jerusalem. The floor is made of Minton tile. The porch features ironwork grills in intricate Moorish patterns.

Above the porch of the Mausoleum is the following inscription.  It is taken from the last verse of the Hebrew hymn Adon Olam: "Within Thy hand I lay my soul / Both when I sleep and when I wake. / And with my soul my body too, / My Lord is with me, I shall not fear".

Beyond the tomb there is a short, Roman pillar of Egyptian porphyry. The pillar was a gift from Mehmet Ali (1768-1849), khedive of Egypt, with whom Montefiore established friendly relations.  It was placed there by Lady Montefiore to indicate where she wished to be buried.  Lady Montefiore died in 1862.

In August 1973, it was reported that the Israeli government had tried to have the remains of Sir Moses moved to Israel.

Notes

References

Sources
Sharman Kadish, Jewish Heritage in England: An Architectural Guide, English Heritage, 2006, pp. 58–62
Carol Herselle Krinsky, Synagogues of Europe; Architecture, History, Meaning; MIT 1985; revised edition, MIT Press, 1986; Dover reprint, 1996, p. 127

External links

 The Montefiore Endowment
 Montefiore Synagogue on Jewish Communities and Records - UK (hosted by jewishgen.org).
 YouTube: Montefiore Synagogue Ramsgate Open Day 2007 (virtual tour)

Ramsgate
Synagogues in England
Sephardi Jewish culture in the United Kingdom
Sephardi synagogues
Grade II listed buildings in Kent
Synagogues completed in 1833
Religion in Kent
Regency and Biedermeier synagogues
Jewish mausoleums
Mausoleums in England
Monuments and memorials in Kent
Religious buildings and structures in Kent
Grade II listed religious buildings and structures
David Mocatta buildings